José Évrard (17 July 1945 – 7 January 2022) was a French politician serving as the member of the National Assembly for the 3rd constituency of Pas-de-Calais since 2017. He was a member of the National Front (FN) until 2017, when he joined The Patriots (LP), which he left in 2020 to become a member of Debout la France (DLF).

Life and career
A native of Cauchy-à-la-Tour, Évrard joined the National Front in 2013. He served as a member of the Departmental Council of Pas-de-Calais for the canton of Harnes from 29 March 2015 to 18 June 2017.

In the 2017 legislative election, Évrard was elected to the National Assembly in the 3rd constituency of Pas-de-Calais. He joined Florian Philippot's The Patriots later that year, dissatisfied with Marine Le Pen's softened Eurosceptic stance. In 2020, he joined Nicolas Dupont-Aignan's Debout la France; he was subsequently chosen to lead the party's list in the 2021 regional election in Hauts-de-France. The list placed sixth in the first round of voting, thus failing to qualify for the second round.

Évrard died from COVID-19 on 7 January 2022, at the age of 76. Previously he had expressed support on social media for protesters against COVID-19 curbs and health measures.

References

1945 births
2022 deaths
Deputies of the 15th National Assembly of the French Fifth Republic
National Rally (France) politicians
Debout la France politicians
Politicians from Hauts-de-France
People from Pas-de-Calais
Deaths from the COVID-19 pandemic in France
Members of Parliament for Pas-de-Calais